Rhodanobacter umsongensis is a Gram-negative, rod-shaped and motile bacterium from the genus of Rhodanobacter which has been isolated from soil from a ginseng field from Umsong in Korea.

References

Xanthomonadales
Bacteria described in 2013